Ythanwells is a village in the Marr area of Aberdeenshire, Scotland, lying  east of Huntly.  The village is sometimes known as Wells of Ythan, although this name strictly refers to the nearby source of the River Ythan.

Ythanwells Church, now semi-derelict and in use as an agricultural barn, was built in 1864.  The village also formerly had a school, which serves today as a community centre.  Ythanwells now comes under the catchment area for Drumblade Primary School.

References 

Villages in Aberdeenshire